The 1895 University of Utah football team was an American football team that represented the University of Utah as an independent during the 1895 college football season. Head coach Walter Shoup led the team to a 0–1 record.

Schedule

References

University of Utah
Utah Utes football seasons
College football winless seasons
University of Utah football